Parnell is a stop on the Luas light-rail tram system in Dublin, Ireland. It opened in 2017 as a stop on Luas Cross City, an extension of the Green Line through the city centre from St. Stephen's Green to Broombridge and is sometimes the northern terminus for many services. It is located on Parnell Street between the intersections with O'Connell Street and Marborough Street, near the Parnell Monument and provides access to the Gate Theatre, the James Joyce Centre, the Hugh Lane Gallery, the Dublin Writers Museum, and Mountjoy Square.

Location
Parnell's single platform is located to the north of the tracks, integrated into the pavement. It is the most northerly stop on the one-way system at the centre of the green line. To the east of the stop is a junction where the two tracks meet and head north on their way from Brides Glen to Broombridge. However, trams which originate at Sandyford turn right at this junction, turning back the way they came; these trams display "Parnell" on their destination boards.

References

Luas Green Line stops in Dublin (city)
Railway stations opened in 2017
2017 establishments in Ireland
Railway stations in the Republic of Ireland opened in the 21st century